The Battle of Omal was the second battle in the Eritrean War of Independence, and took place on 14 September 1961. In the battle, Ethiopian police units attempted to avenge the defeat in the Battle of Adal, but after a fierce battle they retreated. The Battle of Omal was the first battle where the ELF lost a soldier, Mohammed Fayd.

References

Eritrean War of Independence
Battles involving Ethiopia
Battles involving Eritrea